Dry January is a campaign delivered by Alcohol Change UK where people sign up to abstain from alcohol for the month of January. The term "Dry January" is a registered trademark with Alcohol Change UK and was first registered in 2014.

The campaign was first delivered in 2013 by Alcohol Concern (now called Alcohol Change UK)  and 2023 marks the 10th anniversary of the campaign. Businessman and Italian-American, Frank Posillico, founded the campaign in Huntington New York after taking a month off alcohol in January 2008. He boasted of his dramatic weight loss and reduced costs for his nights out.  Emily Robinson was inspired by Frank's movement and she joined Alcohol Concern in 2012 to begin the international campaign. Around the same time Nicole Brodeur of The Seattle Times wrote a column on her first Dry January motivated by a friend who had done the same for several years before.

In its first year, 4,000 people signed up for Dry January and it has grown in popularity ever since with over 130,000 people signing up to take part in 2022. Dry January was endorsed by Public Health England in 2015 leading to a large uptake in numbers and steady increase in participants year on year. Research by the University of Sussex published in 2020 found that those signing up to take part in Dry January using Alcohol Change UK’s free Try Dry app and/or coaching emails were twice as likely to have a completely alcohol-free month, compared to those who try to avoid alcohol on their own in January, and have significantly improved wellbeing and healthier drinking six months later.

International partners 
Dry January has official partners in Switzerland, Germany, Norway, France and the US. Dry January France launched in 2020, by Federation Addiction.  Dry January Switzerland was launched in 2021 by a broad coalition of non-profit organisations, including public innovation platform staatslabor, Blue Cross Switzerland and GREA. Dry January Norway and Iceland was launched in 2022 by a partnership of organisations IOGT, Juvente, and Edru. Dry January Germany will launch in 2023 with Blaues Kreuz Deutschland and Blue Cross Switzerland. Dry January USA will launch in 2023 with Meharry Medical College as the official sub-license holder.

In some countries, such as the Czech Republic and Canada, Dry February (or Dry Feb) is campaigned instead. The Finnish Government had launched a campaign called "Sober January" in 1942 as part of its war effort.

In the United States
A Morning Consult poll conducted from January 4–5, 2021, with 2,200 US adults found that 13 percent of American respondents were participating in "Dry January". This compared with 11% in previous years. 79 percent attributed the decision to being healthier while 72 percent were trying to drink less alcohol in general; 63 percent said they wanted to "reset" their drinking, and 49 percent said they were drinking too much during the COVID-19 pandemic. In 2022, 35% of adult drinkers decided to become abstinent at the start of the New Year. Some people believe that they will go back to their old drinking habits right after Dry January, but recent studies have shown that making this small lifestyle change can have a lasting impact for months down the road

Cautions
For participants with a dependency on alcohol, Dry January may lead to symptoms of alcohol withdrawal syndrome if they start out abstaining completely. For such people, experts advise consultation with a health professional before participating in this exercise.

See also
 Fasting
 International Organisation of Good Templars
 Lent
 Teetotalism
 Temperance movement in the United Kingdom
 Dry July
 Ocsober

References

External links
 Alcohol Change UK: Dry January
Going Dry: The Benefits Of A Month Without Booze by NPR

Drinking culture
Alcohol in the United Kingdom
Alcohol and health
Fasting
January observances
2013 establishments in the United Kingdom
Month-long observances
Alcohol abuse in the United Kingdom
Alcohol abuse